The Memorial Crosses are Finnish specific service medals of the Second World War, i.e. Winter War, Continuation War and Lapland War. They are official awards of Finland and shall be worn after the other official awards in chronological order, however preceding later campaign medals (e.g. different United Nations Medals) and other generic awards for patriotic duty.

Before awarding a Memorial Cross, the board must first consult two verified veterans of said formation, or their representatives. A certificate is issued alongside the Memorial Cross, and the Memorial Cross committee maintains a list of awardees of each Memorial Cross.

Winter War Memorial Crosses
In the Winter War Memorial Crosses were awarded based on participation in different sectors of the theatre.
These are:
Central Karelian Isthmus Cross (abbr. K-Kann mr)
Kainuu Cross (abbr. Kain mr)
Koivisto Cross (abbr. Koiv mr)
Kollaa Cross (abbr. Koll mr)
Ladoga Medal (abbr. Laat mr)
Muolaa Cross (abbr. Muol mr)
Pitkäranta Cross (abbr. Pitk mr)
Summa Cross (abbr. Summan mr)
Taipale Cross (abbr. Taip mr)
Tolvajärvi Cross (abbr. Tolv mr)
War in Lapland Memorial Cross (abbr. Lap mr) - later also called  ('Winter War Lapland Memorial Cross').
Western Karelian Isthmus Cross (abbr. L-Kann mr)

Continuation War Memorial Crosses
In the Continuation War Memorial Crosses were awarded based on different formations.
These are:
1st Division Memorial Cross (abbr. 1. D mr)
4th Division Memorial Cross (abbr. 4. D mr)
6th Division Memorial Cross (abbr. 6. D mr)
10th Division Memorial Cross (abbr. 10. D mr)
12th Division Memorial Cross (abbr. 12. D mr)
15th Brigade Memorial Cross (abbr. 15. Pr mr)
18th Division Memorial Cross (abbr. 18. D mr)
19th Division Memorial Cross (abbr. 19. D mr)
Armoured Division Cross (abbr. PsD mr)
Blue Brigade Memorial Cross (abbr. 3. Pr mr) - Memorial Cross of the 3rd Brigade.
Breacher Division Memorial Cross (abbr. 2. D mr) - Memorial Cross of the 2nd Division.
Brigade K Memorial Cross (abbr. Pr K mr) - Memorial Cross of the Group Kuussaari.
Continuation War Lapland Memorial Cross (abbr.
Eastern Karelian Isthmus Cross (abbr. I-Kann mr) - Memorial Cross of the 15th Division and 19th Brigade.
Eastern Svir Cross (abbr. I-Syv mr) - Memorial Cross of the 5th Corps HQ and direct subordinate units.
Group O – RvPr Memorial Cross (abbr. RO-RvPr mr) -  Memorial Cross of the Cavalry Brigade and Group Oinonen.
Karelian Isthmus Cross (abbr. Kann mr) - Memorial Cross of the 4th Corps and Karelian Isthmus HQs and direct subordinate units.
Lynx Division Memorial Cross (abbr. 5. D mr) - Memorial Cross of the 5th Division.
Maaselkä Memorial Cross (abbr. Maas mr) - Memorial Cross of the 2nd Corps HQ and direct subordinate units.
Northern White Karelia Cross (abbr. P-Vien mr) - Memorial Cross of the 3nd Corps HQ and direct subordinate units.
Oak Division Memorial Cross (abbr. 17. D mr) - Memorial Cross of the 17th Division.
Olonets Cross (abbr. Aun mr) - Memorial Cross of the 6th Corps HQ and direct subordinate units.
Onega Memorial Cross (abbr. Ään mr) - Memorial Cross of the 7th Corps HQ and direct subordinate units.
Outflankers of the Three Isthmuses' Memorial Cross (abbr. 8. D mr) - Memorial Cross of the 8th Division.
Rukajärvi Memorial Cross (abbr. 14. D mr) - Memorial Cross of the 14th Division and Group Raappana.
Sword Cross (abbr. 7. D mr) - Memorial Cross of the 7th Division.
Spearhead Cross (abbr. 11. D mr) - Memorial Cross of the 11th Division.

Winter and Continuation War Memorial Crosses
Several Memorial Crosses were awarded in both Winter and Continuation Wars.
These are:
Air Force Memorial Cross (abbr. Ilmav mr )
Border Jaeger Units' Memorial Cross (abbr. Rajajj mr)
Coastal Troops Memorial Cross (abbr. Rann mr)
Engineer Cross (abbr. Pion mr)
Headquarters' Memorial Cross (abbr. PM mr)
Homefront Memorial Cross (abbr. Kotij mr)
Homefront Women's Medal (abbr. Kotir.n. mr)
Karelia Cross (abbr. Karj mr)
Navy Memorial Cross (abbr. Laiv mr)
War Railroad Formations' Cross (abbr. SRaut mr)

References

Military awards and decorations of Finland
Campaign medals